Herlison Caion de Sousa Ferreira, simply known as Caion (born October 5, 1990), is a Brazilian footballer who plays as a striker for Malaysia Super League club Kuala Lumpur City.

Club career

Early career
Born in Caxias, Maranhão, Caion made his senior debuts with Iraty in 2008, after being a youth player for Icasa in the previous year.

In 2009, he joined Ferroviário. After three months playing for the side in the state leagues, he moved abroad.

Gangwon FC
On 30 March 2009, Caion joined K-League newly formed side Gangwon FC, thus becoming the club's first-ever Brazilian player.

He made his debut for Gangwon on 5 May, against Incheon United, for that year's League Cup, assisting Park Jong-Jin in Gangwon's first goal. He made his league debut on 25 July, against Busan I'Park, as a substitute. Caion scored his first goal in the last match of 2009 K-League, netting the winner against Jeju United.

In the following season, Caion only played in the reserve league, rescinded his link in June 2010.

Back to Brazil
After cancelling his link with Gangwon, Caion returned to Brazil, but only joined a side in November 2011, signing with Caxias. On 25 May 2012 he moved to Mirassol.

On 6 September, after scoring five goals in only six matches, Caion joined Bragantino on loan. After his return to Mirassol, he netted twice in a 6–2 routing over Palmeiras on 27 March 2013.

On 13 May Caion joined Série A side Náutico. However, three months later he moved to Chapecoense.

In January 2014 Caion joined newly promoted side Grêmio Osasco Audax. On 23 April, he moved to Portuguesa. However, two months later he was released by Lusa.

Move to Iraq
In August 2014, Caion joined Al Shorta, the defending Iraqi Premier League champions. Caion became the club's second ever Brazilian player after Cristiano da Silva Santos who left the club in June 2014. Caion scored his first goal in a 2-1 win over Al-Minaa in the league, opening the scoring in the match with an exquisite left-foot finish across the goalkeeper and into the net. He scored his second and final goal in the 2015 AFC Cup as Al-Shorta beat Al-Jazeera 4–0 to top their group and advance to the knockout stage.

HB Køge
In August 2015 Caion signed a contract with the Danish 1st Division club HB Køge. In January 2016 he and the club agreed to end the contract.

Chonburi FC (Loan)
In June 2019, Caion signed a contract with Chonburi FC on loan from PT Prachuap and scored in his debut help team won over Buriram United 1–0.

Selangor
On 27 December 2021, it was confirmed that Caion had signed with Malaysia Super League club Selangor for 2022 season.

Club career statistics

References

External links
 
 
 Profile at Paysandu

1990 births
Living people
Brazilian footballers
Association football forwards
Iraty Sport Club players
Ferroviário Atlético Clube (CE) players
Sociedade Esportiva e Recreativa Caxias do Sul players
Gangwon FC players
Daegu FC players
Mirassol Futebol Clube players
Clube Náutico Capibaribe players
Associação Chapecoense de Futebol players
Grêmio Osasco Audax Esporte Clube players
Associação Portuguesa de Desportos players
Selangor FA players
Malaysia Super League players
K League 1 players
Campeonato Brasileiro Série A players
Campeonato Brasileiro Série B players
Brazilian expatriate footballers
Expatriate footballers in South Korea
Brazilian expatriate sportspeople in South Korea
Expatriate footballers in Iraq
Brazilian expatriate sportspeople in Iraq
Al-Shorta SC players
Paysandu Sport Club players
Expatriate footballers in Thailand
Brazilian expatriate sportspeople in Thailand
Thai League 1 players
Royal Thai Navy F.C. players
PT Prachuap F.C. players
Chonburi F.C. players
Suphanburi F.C. players
Police Tero F.C. players
Muangkan United F.C. players